Antaeotricha hemibathra is a moth in the family Depressariidae. It was described by Edward Meyrick in 1932. It is found in Mexico.

References

Moths described in 1932
hemibathra
Taxa named by Edward Meyrick
Moths of Central America